Patrice Yvonne Holloway (March 23, 1951 – October 3, 2006) was an American soul and pop singer, and songwriter.

Career
Patrice Yvonne Holloway was born on March 23, 1951 in Los Angeles, California, the youngest of three children born to Wade Holloway, Sr. (August 13, 1920 – June 24, 2001) and his wife, the former Johnnie Mae Fossett. Patrice is the younger sister of Motown artist Brenda Holloway. Holloway also had a contract with Motown, recording songs such as "The Touch of Venus" and "For the Love of Mike", none of which were released. She recorded a few minor singles for the Capitol Records label during the mid-1960s, notably "Love And Desire", "Ecstasy" and "Stolen Hours", which became popular on the Northern Soul scene in the 1970s. She sang background vocals with her sister on many records for other artists, including Joe Cocker and the Grease Band's 1968 cover version of The Beatles' "With a Little Help from My Friends", later the theme song to the 1980s television series The Wonder Years. Patrice also recorded the soul classic, "Stay With Your Own Kind", which was noteworthy for its direct treatment of inter-racial relationships at a time when this was highly controversial. Patrice also co-wrote 'You've Made Me So Very Happy', which in 1969 rose to No. 3 on the Billboard Hot 100 when the band Blood Sweat & Tears covered it, two years after it was co-written and originally recorded by her sister Brenda.

Holloway is most noted for her work as the singing voice of Valerie in Hanna-Barbera's 1970 Josie and the Pussycats television series and on the concurrent Josie and the Pussycats album. Valerie was the first female African-American cartoon character to star as a television series regular (and the first of any gender also voiced by Black artists, Barbara Pariot being her speaking voice), and was nearly cut from the show by nervous executives. Record producer Danny Janssen demanded that Holloway—and therefore Valerie—remain in the show, as he felt her voice was necessary to produce the Jackson 5-esque bubblegum pop that H-B had requested he produce. It is Patrice's voice that does lead on the series' theme song, "Josie and The Pussycats", amongst many other songs.

After the first season of Josie, Holloway recorded a few solo singles, produced by Janssen, for Capitol Records. Neither she, nor Pussycats bandmates Cheryl Ladd and Cathy Dougher, performed the songs for the second-season, which was titled Josie and the Pussycats in Outer Space.

Holloway died of a heart attack at the age of 55 on October 3, 2006.

Selected discography

Singles
 1963: "Stevie" b/w "(He Is) The Boy of My Dreams" (V.I.P. 25001)
 1966: "Stolen Hours" b/w "Lucky, My Boy" (Capitol)
 1967: "Love and Desire" b/w "Ecstasy" (Capitol)
 1967: "Stay with Your Own Kind" b/w "That's All You Got To Do" (Capitol 5985)
 1971: "That's The Chance You Gotta Take" b/w "Evidence" (Capitol)
 1972: "Black Mother Goose" b/w "That's The Chance You Gotta Take" (Capitol)

Backing vocal credits
 1968: Joe Cocker – "With a Little Help from My Friends"
 1969: Diana Ross & the Supremes – "Someday We'll Be Together" 
 1969: Thelma Houston – Sunshower 
 1969: Joe Cocker – Joe Cocker!
 1970: Kim Weston - Kim Kim Kim
 1970: Diana Ross – "Reach Out and Touch" 
 1971: Beaver & Krause – Gandharva 
 1972: Buffy Sainte-Marie – Moonshot

References

External links

 Remembering Patrice Holloway

1951 births
2006 deaths
Singers from Los Angeles
American soul singers
American sopranos
American voice actresses
20th-century American women singers
African-American women singers
20th-century American singers
African-American actresses
Capitol Records artists
Motown artists
Ike & Tina Turner members
The Blackberries members